Suryakanthi is a 2010 Indian Kannada language film directed by K.M. Chaitanya and starring Chetan Kumar, Regina Cassandra, Nassar. The music is scored by Illayaraja.

Premise
The film is a story of an international assassin played by Chetan.

Cast
 Chetan Kumar as Rohith / Surya
 Regina Cassandra as Kaanti
 Nassar as Malanna Bahdur
 Ganesh Yadav as Stalin
 Ramakrishna as Saheba
 Kishori Ballal
 Sangeetha Gopal (Cameo)

Soundtrack

Reception

Critical response 

R G Vijayasarathy of Rediff.com scored the film at 2.5 out of 5 stars and says "As mentioned earlier, H C Venu's outdoor images are visually strong. Ilayaraja is very good in creating the background score. His two song compositions Edheya Baagilu Thattadhe and Mouna Neenu have raised above the bar of excellence. Chaithanya's Suryakanthi is worth a watch for Ilayaraja's work and superb outdoor shoot". B S Srivani from Deccan Herald wrote "So are Chetan and Regina. Dialogues sometimes tend to be stilted though... Swaying with gentle twists and turns, "Suryakaanti" allows little time for emotions to register. But this may indeed indicate a future when viewer intelligence finally gets its due. For now, "Suryakaanti" is an entertainer foremost and on that count, is "bhar-poor" 'paisa vasool' film". A critic from Bangalore Mirror wrote  "Chetan's acting gets better by the day and Regina too has done a decent job. Ganesh Yadav as Stalin is brilliant in his role. The music is just about okay. The cinematography is commendable. All in all, the direction by  K M Chaitanya has worked wonders this time too".

References

2010s Kannada-language films
2010 films
Films scored by Ilaiyaraaja
Films directed by K. M. Chaitanya